Do Be Quick is a 1977 Czech drama film directed by Stanislav Strnad. It was entered into the 10th Moscow International Film Festival.

Cast
 Zdenek Hradilák as Frantisek Kabát
 Marie Drahokoupilová as Tereza Kabátová
 Ivan Lutansky as Ivan Kabát
 Martin Růžek as Emil Martinec
 Karolina Slunécková as Eva Martincová
 Radoslav Brzobohatý as Jirí Voník
 Milena Dvorská
 Adolf Filip as nadporucík VB
 Grazyna Sahatqiu as Alena Martincová
 Jana Gýrová as Ruzena Voníková
 Miloš Willig as Václav Houdek

References

External links
 

1977 films
1977 drama films
1970s Czech-language films
Czechoslovak drama films
Czech drama films
1970s Czech films